The 1928–29 Campionat de Catalunya season was the 30th since its establishment and was played between 30 September and 2 December 1928.

Overview before the season
Six teams joined the Division One league, including three that would play the 1929 La Liga:

Barcelona
Espanyol
Europa

Division One

League table

Results

Top goalscorers

Play-off league

Division Two

Group A

Group B

Group C

Repechage

Relegation playoff

Copa Catalunya seasons
1928–29 in Spanish football